The 2014–15 Kansas Jayhawks women's basketball team will represent the University of Kansas in the 2014–15 NCAA Division I women's basketball season. This was head coach Bonnie Henrickson's eleventh season at Kansas. They play their home games at Allen Fieldhouse in Lawrence, Kansas and were members of the Big 12 Conference. They finished the season 15–17, 6–12 in Big 12 play to finish in ninth place. They lost in the first round of the Big 12 women's tournament to their in-state rival Kansas State.

Roster

Schedule and results 

|-
!colspan=9 style="background:#E8000D; color:#0022B4;"| Exhibition

|-
!colspan=9 style="background:#0022B4; color:#E8000D;"| Non-Conference Games

|-
!colspan=9 style="background:#0022B4; color:#E8000D;"| Big 12 Regular Season

|-
!colspan=9 style="background:#E8000D; color:#0022B4;"| 2015 Big 12 women's basketball tournament

x- All JTV games will air on Metro Sports, ESPN3 and local affiliates.

See also 
 2014–15 Kansas Jayhawks men's basketball team

References 

Kansas Jayhawks women's basketball seasons
Kansas
2014 in sports in Kansas
2015 in sports in Kansas